Shir Hesar (also Romanized as Shīr Ḩeşār) is a village in Miyan Velayat Rural District, in the Central District of Mashhad County, Razavi Khorasan Province, Iran. At the 2006 census, its population was 431, in 102 families.

References 

Populated places in Mashhad County